Nagadeba indecoralis is a moth of the family Noctuidae first described by Francis Walker in 1865. It is found in Sri Lanka, Java, India, Myanmar, India's Andaman Islands, Japan and Taiwan.

Adult dark and dull coloured. A conspicuously pale orbicular stigma is found on the undersides of the forewing. The caterpillar is spindle-shaped, fattest centrally, and is a semi-looper. Head and body are greenish. Head with areas of brown dots. Body with most setae arising from black spots. A darker dorsal line and a thin yellowish to white line runs through the spiracles. Spiracles are small, yellowish, with shining black rims. Pupation takes place on the ground made up of particles of detritus. The caterpillar is known to feed on Mussaenda species.

References

Moths of Asia
Moths described in 1865